Giessen-Oudekerk is a town in the Dutch province of South Holland. It is a part of the municipality of Molenlanden, and lies about 8 km west of Gorinchem.

The statistical area "Giessen-Oudekerk", which also can include the surrounding countryside, has a population of around 890.

See also
Lord of Giesenoudkerck: See House of van de Werve.

References

Populated places in South Holland
Molenlanden